The 2022–2023 mpox outbreak in Germany is part of an ongoing global outbreak of human mpox caused by the West African clade of the monkeypox virus. At the beginning of September 2022, Spain, France, Germany and the United Kingdom are the countries with most cumulative cases (in absolute numbers) in Europe.

Background

Detection in Europe

Transmission

History 
On 20 May 2022, the first case of mpox was serologically detected in a man in Munich, who showed "characteristic skin changes" already the day before.

May & June 2022 
Until the end of May 2022, 33 cases of mpox were confirmed, on 10 June the (cumulated) number of cases was 165, and as of 5 July the number rose to 1,242.

As of 3 June 2022, the most affected federal state of Germany in terms of reported cases has been the city-state of Berlin − with 39 reported cases in Berlin and 65 in the whole country, and as of 28 June Berlin reported about two thirds of all cases (557 out of 838). The city-state planned to start vaccination during the week of 4 July.

July 2022 
 there were 1,054 cases reported for the whole country, albeit the Robert Koch Institute (RKI) expounded that the situation was not worrisome ("nicht beunruhigend") for the general population.
 there were 761 reported cases in city-state of Berlin alone; one article criticized that vaccinations had not yet started in Berlin, although 8,000 vaccine doses of non-replicating smallpox vaccine were already in stock. Vaccination in Berlin were going to start in the week of 11 July. 

 there were 1,490 reported cases in Germany. On 19, 2 July 033 (cumulative) cases were reported, with 1,140 cases in Berlin alone; on 22 July, the state of Berlin was applying for more vaccine allocations due to high demand.

On 22 July 2022, the European Medicines Agency recommended the approval of Imvanex smallpox vaccine for the prevention of mpox disease, and the European Commission subsequently approved it. (The vaccinations with Imvanex started earlier, depending on the federal state; in Lower Saxony they started on 3 July 2022 and in Berlin on 13 July.)

Till July 2022, the Federal Republic has received 40,000 doses (of the Imvanex smallpox vaccine) and distributed them to the federal states. Another 200,000 vaccine doses are expected for September. At the end of July, the Deutsche Aidshilfe e.V. (de) appealed to the German government to order 1 million vaccine doses in order to enable the (full) vaccination of up to 500,000 people.

August 2022 
Till 5 August 2022, 2887 confirmed cases were reported for the whole country and about half of the cases (1436) were reported from city-state of Berlin alone. In addition to the 9,500 vaccine doses Berlin already received, the federal government is expected give Berlin an additional 1,900 doses in the week of 8 August 2022. 

In Berlin where the highest number of reported new mpox infections occurred for a long time, this number has decreased significantly by mid-August. By 19 August 2022, 6417 vaccinations (including 90 second shots) against mpox had been administered at the 28 vaccination sites in Berlin.

Since September 2022 
As of 9 September 2022, a total of 3530 cases of mpox have been reported to RKI, including 14 cases in females and 2 cases in children younger than 14 years. The weekly number of newly reported cases has been declining since early August.

Since the number of cases reported each week has fallen to low numbers (quite persistently below 50), the RKI will provide information only once a week on Tuesday, starting in the second week of October 2022.

Intervention

Vaccination 
On 30 June 2022 − with pre-publication on 21 June − the RKI recommended Imvanex smallpox vaccine for post-exposure prophylaxis (PEP), for people with high risk of infection and for people with risk of a severe course of the disease. Due to the limited resources of Imvanex there are priorisations. The Imvanex smallpox vaccine is administered subcutaneously. (Unlike the first and second generation smallpox vaccines.)

On 21 July, the Standing Committee on Vaccination (STIKO) recommended to use only one dose per person (instead of two) of the Imvanex smallpox vaccine for the time being − so that more people can be vaccinated.

Since 19 August 2022, the European Medicines Agency (EMA) also allows intradermal administration of the vaccine, which requires only one-fifth the dose amount (compared with subcutaneous administration) to induce similar antibody levels.

Isolation 
The RKI recommends that persons with diagnosed mpox isolate themselves at home for at least 21 days. Isolation can be mandatory by ordinance of the "Gesundheitsamt" (local health authority). This mandatory isolation period can also apply to close contacts that are vaccinated and show no signs of infection.

Cumulative number of cases 
In order to restrict the links for mere case numbers there are perhaps only some links for special days (like the end of a month or days that are not archived by the Wayback machine). The RKI reports data from Monday to Friday and German press relies on this data for the overall number, so there are no new cases on Saturday or Sunday. The data can be verified with the Internet Archive ("Wayback Machine") of the webpage from the RKI, see #RKI & CDC data.

References: 
 GER: 13 June, 14th,17th, 30th, 7 July, 8th, 13th, 15th, 22nd, 29th, 1 August, 2nd, 3rd, 5th, 10th, 12th, 18th, 19th, 22nd, 25th, 29th, 30th, 1 Sept., 6th, 9th, 13th, 16th, 19th, 21 Sept., 23rd, 27th, 30th, Oct. 4th, Oct. 11th, 18th, 25th, Nov. 1st, 8th, 22nd

 UK: 2022–2023 mpox outbreak in the United Kingdom#History, rev. 8 July 2022
 U.S.: 2022–2023 mpox outbreak in the United States#Timeline, rev. 8 Oct. 2022
 FRA: 2022–2023 mpox outbreak in France#Cases, rev. 8 Oct. 2022
 Berlin: 9 June, 13 June, 20 June, June 28, 5 July, 19 July, 5 August, 17th, 26th,  31th, 21 Sept., 27 Sept.

   
 

Weekly new cases

Note: In early October 2022 change in the time period since RKI will now provide information only once a week on Tuesday.

See also 
 Non-replicating smallpox vaccine
 2022–2023 mpox outbreak
 2022–2023 mpox outbreak in Europe
 22022–2023 mpoxypox outbreak in Austria
 2022–2023 mpox outbreak in France
 2022–2023 mpox outbreak in Italy
 2022–2023 mpox outbreak in the Netherlands
 2022–2023 mpox outbreak in Portugal
 2022–2023 mpox outbreak in Spain
 2022–2023 mpox outbreak in Switzerland
 2022–2023 mpox outbreak in the United Kingdom

External links 

 Our World in Data - Monkeypox (ourworldindata.org)
 Affenpocken in Deutschland: Erste klinische Beobachtungen (www.aerzteblatt.de, 29 July 2022, in German) 
 Monkeypox in Germany: Initial clinical observations (English version) 
 INFORMATION SHEET For Vaccination against Monkeypox – IMVANEX® / JYNNEOS® with Smallpox Vaccine from Bavarian Nordic (www.rki.de)
 Bezirk Mitte startet Impfung gegen Affenpocken (www.berlin.de): Webpage contains the number of the telephone hotline of the "Beratungsstelle für sexuelle Gesundheit" (Sexual Health Counseling Center) of the municipality "Berlin-Mitte".(According to a press report the center serves in its day-to-day work primarily "people without health insurance and people who wish to remain anonymous".)

RKI data (German numbers) 
  Updated from Monday to Friday, published by the RKI
 Archive of "Internationaler Affenpocken-Ausbruch: Fallzahlen und Einschätzung der Situation in Deutschland" (RKI) on the Wayback Machine
 SurvStat@RKI 2.0 (survstat.rki.de) Web page for querying diseases and pathogens reported to the RKI, including mpox. Output option in English.

CDC data (world map) 
 2022 Monkeypox Outbreak Global Map (www.cdc.gov)

Notes

References 
Some of the sources are witten in German language, they can be translated with services like Google Translate and its alternatives. 

Germany
Mpox
Mpox